Jesus Killing Machine is the debut album by German heavy metal band Voodoocult, released in February 1994.

Release
The album was issued on CD and vinyl. The vinyl saw an initial limited circulation of 1,000 and was re-released in a package with the single Metallized Kids three months later, this time with limited circulation of 1,500. The Japanese edition was released in January 1995 and contained two bonus tracks. The album features two tracks that had been released on albums of Boa's main band Phillip Boa & The Voodooclub and that are presented in metal style on Jesus Killing Machine.

Track listing

Personnel

Voodoocult
 Phillip Boa – vocals
 Chuck Schuldiner – guitar
 Gabby Abularach – guitar
 Waldemar Sorychta – guitar
 Mille Petrozza – guitar
 Dave Ball – bass
 Dave Lombardo – drums

Additional personnel
 David Vella – recording
 E.roc – recording, engineering, mixing
 Waldemar Sorychta – production, recording, mixing
 Tom Morris – recording
 Andy Drudy – pilot guitar
 Ulf Hobelt – mastering
 Siggi Bemm – drum editing, technical advice

Chart positions

References

1994 albums
Voodoocult albums
Albums produced by Waldemar Sorychta